Hans Peter Geil, from Venstre, had been mayor of Haderslev Municipality for the last two terms. However he announced in September 2020, that he would not stand to be re-elected for a third term. In December 2020 it was announced that the top candidate for Venstre in this election would be Mads Skau.

In the 2017 Haderslev municipal election, parties of the traditional blue bloc had won 16 of 31 seats and a slim majority. For this election, a majority between the traditional blue bloc parties would once again be won. However, the parties and their total seats would change rather dramatically. While Venstre would keep their 9 seats, The New Right would enter the council for the first time with 2 seats, while the Liberal Alliance would lose both of its 2 seats. Danish People's Party would also suffer a 3-seat decrease, while the Conservatives would go from 1 seat to 5 seats. Of the traditional red bloc parties, only the seats number of the Red–Green Alliance would change, decreasing by one. It was later confirmed that Venstre would once again hold the mayor position, and Mads Skau would become the new mayor

Electoral system
For elections to Danish municipalities, a number varying from 9 to 31 are chosen to be elected to the municipal council. The seats are then allocated using the D'Hondt method and a closed list proportional representation.
Haderslev Municipality had 31 seats in 2021

Unlike in Danish General Elections, in elections to municipal councils, electoral alliances are allowed.

Electoral alliances  

Electoral Alliance 1

Electoral Alliance 2

Electoral Alliance 3

Electoral Alliance 4

Results

Notes

References 

Haderslev